Paolo Casadei (born 11 April 1966) is a Sammarinese weightlifter. He competed in the men's lightweight event at the 1988 Summer Olympics.

References

1966 births
Living people
Sammarinese male weightlifters
Olympic weightlifters of San Marino
Weightlifters at the 1988 Summer Olympics
Place of birth missing (living people)